M.H. (Machiel Hendricus) Laddé (5 November 1866 – 18 February 1932) was a Dutch photographer and film director. He was the director of the first Dutch fictional film, the 1896 comedy Gestoorde hengelaar (English: Disturbed Angler).

Between 1896 and c.1906 Laddé made several short silent movies for the studio Eerst Nederlandsch Atelier tot het vervaardigen van Films voor de Bioscoop en Cinematograaf M.H. Laddé & J.W. Merkelbach. These were shown by the traveling cinema of Christiaan Slieker (1861-1945).

None of Laddé's films have been preserved.

Laddé also was a well-known photographer with his own studio in Buiksloot (now part of Amsterdam) and was the son-in-law of the photographer J.W. Merkelbach (Johannes Wilhelm, known as Wim) (1873-1922) who was his business partner.

Filmography 
 Gestoorde hengelaar (1896)
 Spelende kinderen (1896)
 Zwemplaats voor Jongelingen te Amsterdam (1896)
 Solser en Hesse (1900)

See also 
 Dutch films before 1910

References

External links 
 

1866 births
1932 deaths
Dutch film directors
19th-century Dutch photographers
Artists from Amsterdam
Place of birth missing